Sharp is a Korean drama that aired from November 29, 2003, to February 25, 2007, on KBS2.

Series overview

Season 1
 First aired : November 29, 2003
 Last aired : February 27, 2005
 Writers : Hong Jin-ah, Hong Ja-ram, Kwon Ki-kyung

Cast
Go Ara as Lee Ok-rim
Seo Hyun-seok as Jang Wook
 Uhm Hong-sik as Yoo Ah-in
Lee Eun-sung as Seo Jung-min
Hyun Jung-eun as Lee Yoon-jung
Kim Si-hoo as Lee Soon-shin
Kim Jung-min as Park Se-ri
Joo Bo-bi 
Oh Yeon-seo as Lee Ye-rim (Ok-rim's sister)
Park Hoon-jung as Lee Ha-rim (Ok-rim's brother)
Kang Seok-woo as Lee Sang-heum (Ok-rim's father)
Lee Eung-kyung as Kim Sung-hee (Ok-rim's mother)
Kwak Ji-min as Kang Dong-hee
Kim Ha-kyoon as Kim Jung-sik
Kim Ye-ryeong as Wook's mother
Kim Hye-ok as Se-ri's mother
Lee Min-ho as Jin-ho
Kim Hee-jung as Lee Yu-ri (episode 36–37)
Oh Soo-min as Jang Mi-yeon (episode 20)
Heo Yi-jae as young Gong Yeon-hee (episode 42)
Ryu Deok-hwan as Hwang Tae-min (episode 9)
Hahm Eun-jung Ye-rim's friend (episode 5)
Choo Ja-hyun as Narration

Season 2
 First aired : March 6, 2005
 Last aired : February 26, 2006
 Writers : Park Sun-ja, Kwon Ki-kyung, Noh Yoo-kyung

Cast
Go Ara as Lee Ok-rim
Kim Ki-bum as Joo Yeo-myeong
Lee Eun-sung as Seo Jung-min
Kim Hee-chul as Baek Jin-woo
Kim Hyun-joo as Lee Eun-young
Ahn Nae-sang as Choi Jong-beom
Park Hyung-jae as Ye Seok-doo
Park Hoon-jung as Lee Ha-rim (Ok-rim's brother)
Kang Seok-woo as Lee Sang-heum (Ok-rim's father)
Lee Eung-kyung as Kim Sung-hee (Ok-rim's mother)
Jung Ji-ahn as Ha Eun-shim

Season 3
 First aired : March 5, 2006
 Last aired : February 25, 2007
 Writers : Yoon Ji-ryun, Park Sun-ja

Cast
 Seo Jun-young as Park Yi-joon
 Jung Da-ya as Joo Shi-eun
 Seo Min-woo as Kong Yun
 Jang Ah-young as Jang Ah-young
 Kim Dae-sung as Lee Han-byeol
 Yeo Min-joo as Na Hae-mi
 Bae Geu-rin as Bae Geu-rin
 Jung Eun-woo as Uhm Sung-min
 Ahn Yong-joon as Bae Sung-jun
 Ahn Nae-sang as Choi Sung-beom
 Lee Won-jong as Park Jam-bong (Yi-joon's father)
 Kim Eul-dong as Han Jung-hee

References

External links

Korean-language television shows
2003 South Korean television series debuts
2007 South Korean television series endings
Korean Broadcasting System television dramas
South Korean teen dramas